Anne M. Andrews is the Richard Metzner Endowed Chair in Clinical Neuropharmacology, Professor of Chemistry & Biochemistry, and Professor of Psychiatry & Behavioral Sciences at the University of California, Los Angeles. Andrews is known for her work  on the study of the serotonin system with a special focus on how the serotonin transporter modulates complex behaviors including anxiety, mood, stress responsiveness, and learning and memory.

Andrews' research career has been distinguished by advancing both basic and translational research questions in chemical neuroscience. She is the leader of an interdisciplinary research team at UCLA engaged in the development of innovative nanomaterial based in vivo biosensors for neurotransmitters. In addition to the design of new tools for neuroscience, her research team has established longstanding leadership in leveraging genetic and pharmacologic animal models to interrogate the molecular basis of function in the serotonin system and how this system interacts with other neurotransmitter networks. Such studies are promising for extending understanding of anxiety disorders and neurodegenerative disorders, including Parkinson's disease and Alzheimer's disease.

Andrews' research career has focused on the neurochemistry of the brain's serotonin system. One of her goals is the design of sensors which would be broadly applicable to all neurotransmitters, and other biologically relevant small molecules. Andrews is a recipient of an NIH Director's Transformative Research Award in support of her research efforts to develop such sensors which would enable interrogating how information is encoded across diverse pathways associated with chemical neurotransmission. Andrews was one of the earliest advocates for the BRAIN Initiative and has been a longstanding advocate for importance of supporting research at the nexus of nanoscience and neuroscience to support research advances in fields including chemical connectomics.

Education, research, and service 
Andrews grew up in Pittsburgh and discovered her passion for science, and most especially chemistry, during her middle school science classes. She would go on to receive her B.S. in Chemistry Pennsylvania State University where during her time as a student she was an intern in the Toxicology and Forensic Pathology Departments at the Pittsburgh's Coroners Office. It was in this environment that Andrews has shared that she received a more nuanced exposure to bioanalytical chemistry, instrumentation, chromatography, and handling biological samples. Andrews would subsequently work as an analytical chemist at Hazleton Laboratories in Vienna, VA.

In support of her expanding research interests in the biomedical sciences, Andrews pursued and received her Ph.D. in Chemistry from the American University where her thesis research was performed in the laboratory of Dr. Dennis L. Murphy at the National Institute of Mental Health (NIHM). Andrews was as an NIH Predoctoral Fellow and U.S. Department of Education Fellow during her graduate studies. After receiving her doctorate, Andrews continued her research at the NIMH as a postdoctoral fellow and subsequently was a senior staff fellow until 1998. During her time at the NIMH, Andrews was a leader in the earliest studies on animal models of serotonin transporter deficiencies. She also discovered and profiled a novel serotonin neurotoxin, 2'NH2-MPTP. Prior to joining the faculty at UCLA, Andrews was a faculty member in the Department of Chemistry at her undergraduate alma mater Pennsylvania State University.

In the areas of service, Andrews is Associate Editor for the ACS Chemical Neuroscience journal.  Andrews is President-elect of the International Society for Serotonin Research and a member of the American College of Neuropsychopharmacology, the Society for Neuroscience, the American Chemical Society, and the Society for Electroanalytical Chemistry. At UCLA, Andrews is a member of the California Nanosystems Institute, the Semel Institute for Neuroscience & Human Behavior, and the Hatos Center for Neuropharmacology. Andrews was involved with the team proposal for the BRAIN Initiative and has also elaborated independently on the opportunities and potential associated with advancing such research frontiers, including for the study of chemical connectomics.

Notable publications

Awards 

 National Institute of Health Director's Transformative Research Award, 2017
 Elected member, American College of Neuropyschopharmacology
 Fellow, Collegium Internationale Neuropsychopharmacologicum
 Fellows Award for Research Excellence, National Institute of Health
 Outstanding Young Analytical Chemist Award, Eli Lilly 
 Research Award, American Parkinson Disease Association
 Councillor, Serotonin Club
 Independent Investigator Award, NARSAD
 Postdoctoral Intermural Research Training Award, National Institutes of Health
 Predoctoral Intermural Research Training Award, National Institutes of Health
 Fellowship, United States Department of Education
 Member, Sigma Xi Scientific Research Society

References 

Year of birth missing (living people)
Place of birth missing (living people)
Living people
American neuroscientists
American University alumni
Eberly College of Science alumni
David Geffen School of Medicine at UCLA faculty
American women neuroscientists
Academic journal editors
Scientists from Pittsburgh
American women academics
21st-century American women